Natalie Schneider (born February 11, 1983) is an American wheelchair basketball player from Crete, Nebraska and Paralympic four-time gold medalist. She got her first gold medal at the 2008 Summer Paralympics and got the second one at the North American Cup same year. In 2010, she won gold medal at IWBF World Championship.

References

1983 births
Living people
American women's wheelchair basketball players
People from Crete, Nebraska
Paralympic gold medalists for the United States
Paralympic wheelchair basketball players of the United States
Wheelchair basketball players at the 2008 Summer Paralympics
Medalists at the 2008 Summer Paralympics
Paralympic medalists in wheelchair basketball
Wheelchair basketball players at the 2012 Summer Paralympics
Wheelchair basketball players at the 2016 Summer Paralympics
Wheelchair basketball players at the 2020 Summer Paralympics
Basketball players from Nebraska
Medalists at the 2020 Summer Paralympics
Paralympic bronze medalists for the United States
21st-century American women
20th-century American women